Prince Guang or Kuang may refer to:

Helü, King of Wu, was Prince Guang before ascending the throne
Duke Zhuang II of Qi, was Prince Guang before ascending the throne